HabiJax of Jacksonville, Florida, is one of the larger affiliates of Habitat for Humanity International (HFHI) in the United States. Habijax was named the 8th largest homebuilder in the United States by Builder Magazine for  2009. 
The program builds "simple, decent, and affordable" housing using volunteer labor and sells them at no profit, with no interest charged on the 25 year mortgage. HabiJax completed their 1,500th home in 2007, and 2008 marked 20 years of service to the Jacksonville community.

Local cooperation
HabiJax has a good working relationship with the Jacksonville Housing Authority and many local businesses and organizations contribute to the program; their employees and members volunteer in the actual building. Companies include JEA, Jacksonville Jaguars, Stein Mart, Everbank, Northeast Florida Builders Association, Blue Cross and Blue Shield of Florida, Swisher International Group and Fidelity National Financial. Faith-based sponsors include coalitions from Episcopal, Baptist, Methodist, Presbyterian, Lutheran and Catholic churches. Even U.S. Navy Sailors volunteer one day each week while their ship is in port.

Fairway Oaks
The Jimmy Carter Work Project constructed the Fairway Oaks community of 85 single-family homes in 17 days. The former President and his wife, Roselyn were joined by former Housing Secretary Jack Kemp, Habitat founders Linda and Millard Fuller, Jaguars owners Delores and Wayne Weaver and Mayor John Delaney, who worked with local volunteers in September, 2000.

On January 25, 2002, during a visit to the Fairway Oaks HabiJax site in north Jacksonville, the Secretary of the U.S. Department of Housing and Urban Development Mel Martinez  said, "Sweat equity programs, like Habitat for Humanity, help more and more low-income families open the door to homeownership." Some residents of the Fairway Oaks development have subsequently complained of health problems. Some residents argued that part of the development was constructed over a landfill, with one resident finding layers of garbage under his kitchen floorboards. Other residents allege poor construction. A lawsuit filed against HabiJax and the City of Jacksonville was dismissed

References

External links
HabiJax-Habitat for Humanity, Jacksonville official website
Habitat for Humanity, International official website

1988 establishments in Florida
Non-profit organizations based in Jacksonville, Florida
Homelessness charities
Organizations established in 1988
Habitat for Humanity